George McArthur Lawson (11 July 1906 – 3 July 1978) was a Labour Party politician in the United Kingdom.  He was the Member of Parliament for Motherwell from a by-election in 1954 until his retirement at the October 1974 general election.

Career
Lawson was educated at elementary schools in North Merchiston. He had been active in the labour movement for 20 years prior to becoming an MP. He served as tutor and organiser in Labour Colleges from 1937 until 1950, including serving as West of Scotland organiser of Labour Colleges. He became the secretary of Edinburgh Trades Council in 1950 and also served on the Scottish Advisory Committee of the Labour Party.

References

External links 

1906 births
1978 deaths
Ministers in the Wilson governments, 1964–1970
Scottish Labour MPs
UK MPs 1951–1955
UK MPs 1955–1959
UK MPs 1959–1964
UK MPs 1964–1966
UK MPs 1966–1970
UK MPs 1970–1974
UK MPs 1974